On December 15, 1829, a special election was held in  to fill a vacancy caused by the resignation of Representative-elect William Wilkins (AM) on November 9, 1829, prior to the start of the 21st Congress.

Election results

Denny took his seat on December 30, 1829.

See also
List of special elections to the United States House of Representatives

References

Pennsylvania 1829 16
Pennsylvania 1829 16
1829 16
Pennsylvania 16
United States House of Representatives 16
United States House of Representatives 1829 16